Index Medical College Hospital and Research Centre, Indore, established in 2007, is a full-fledged tertiary private Medical college and hospital. It is located at Indore, Madhya Pradesh. The college imparts the degree of Bachelor of Medicine and Surgery (MBBS).

Courses
Index Medical College Hospital and Research Centre, Indore undertakes education and training of 250 students in MBBS courses.

Affiliated
The college is affiliated with Malwanchal University and is recognized by the National Medical Commission.

References

Educational institutions established in 2007
Medical colleges in Madhya Pradesh